Henri Eugène Amédée Beauclair (December 21, 1860 at Lisieux – May 11, 1919 in Paris) was a French poet, novelist, and journalist. He was the chief editor of the daily newspaper Le Petit Journal from 1906 to 1914. He worked for a number of publications, including Lutèce, Le Chat noir, Le Procope, journal parlé (1893–1898), and Le Sagittaire, a monthly revue of art and literature (1900–1901).

He had a taste and an unquestionable talent for satire and pastiche. He collaborated with poet Gabriel Vicaire, with whom he wrote the famous Déliquescences of Adoré Floupette (1885), a parody of the Decadent movement in poetry which caused several months of vigorous debate within Parisian literary circles.

Works 
Poetry
L'Eternelle chanson, triolets (1884)
Les Déliquescences d'Adoré Floupette (1885)
Les Horizontales (1885) 
Pentecôte (1886)

Novels and essays
Le Pantalon de Madame Desnou (1886)
Ohé ! l'Artiste (1887)
La Ferme à Goron (1888)
Une heure chez M. Barrès par un faux Renan (1890)
Tapis vert (1897)

References 
This article is translated from the French Wikipedia.

External links 

 
 From the Electronic Library of Lisieux: Les Déliquescences d'Adoré Floupette; Les Horizontales ;Une heure chez M. Barrès par un faux Renan ;La ferme à Goron; Ville natale; Ohé ! l'Artiste; Le Pantalon de Madame Desnou; L’Éternelle chanson.
 Gallica [image files]: La ferme à Goron; Ohé ! l'Artiste; Une heure chez M. Barrès par un faux Renan; Tapis vert.
Un chef-d'œuvre du pastiche by G. Delatramblais (1924).

1860 births
1919 deaths
People from Lisieux
19th-century French poets
French journalists
French male poets
19th-century French male writers
French male non-fiction writers